Happy Days  is a 2007 Indian Telugu-language musical coming of age film written, produced and directed by Sekhar Kammula. The film features Varun Sandesh, Rahul Haridas, Nikhil Siddharth, Vamsee Krishna, Tamannaah, Sonia Deepti, Gayatri Rao, and Monali Chowdhary in the lead roles. The plot explores the college life and experiences of eight friends.

The film was dubbed in Malayalam and remade in Kannada as Jolly Days and in Tamil as Inidhu Inidhu by actor Prakash Raj. The film won six Filmfare Awards South, and three Nandi Awards.

Plot
Happy Days tells us a story that explores the lives of eight friends through the four years of their engineering course. Each one of them joins Chaitanya Bharathi Institute of Technology with their own set of idiosyncrasies, eccentricities, beliefs and ideals. What starts off as a journey of individuals, slowly becomes a collective one over time. They bond over as they go through bullying seniors, stringent professors, intense examinations, over the top celebrations, love, betrayal, sacrifice and every other possible emotion that an individual can experience in a college. The movie portrays the mindset of a typical engineering student which helped youth to connect with the characters involved.

Cast

 Varun Sandesh as Chandrashekar "Chandu"
 Tamannaah as Madhu
 Nikhil Siddharth as Rajesh
 Sonia Deepti as Shravanthi "Shravs"
 Vamsee Chaganti as Shankar
 Gayatri Rao as Aparna "Appu"
 Rahul Haridas as Arjun "Tyson"
 Monali Chowdhary as Sangeetha
 Gururaj Manepalli as College Principal 
 Kamalinee Mukherjee as Shreya Madam (Guest Appearance)
 Krishnudu as Bandodu
 Randhir Gattla as Naveen
 Aadarsh Balakrishna as Sanjay
 Vamshi as Paidithalli
 Adithya as Praveen
 Shruti as Prashanthi
 Sandhya Janak as Madhu's mother

Production

Casting
Sekhar Kammula held a talent search at Big FM and idlebrain.com and managed to select seven of the eight lead actors. He had to cast Tamannaah as a suitable actress was not found. The main lead of the film was selected using the internet without any direct audition. Varun Sandesh did not audition for his role. He sent his photograph by e-mail in response to idlebrain.com advertisement and subsequently sent a video clip of himself enacting certain scenes along with a song via Google Video. Damidi Kamalakar Reddy, founding Secretary and Treasurer of Chaitanya Engineering College, acted as a Professor/Lecturer in a brief cameo role.

Location
Most of the movie was shot at Chaitanya Bharathi Institute of Technology (CBIT) and Mahatma Gandhi Institute of Technology MGIT. In fact, the opening scene between Appu and Rajesh was shot in MGIT with select scenes shot outdoors. Sekhar is an alumnus of CBIT, and he found it to be a suitable location. He had to arrange a special screening of Anand to the chairman of CBIT and its board members to convince them for an on-site shoot. Apparently, after watching Anand, the board granted their permission to shoot the film.

Cost cutting measures
Sekhar Kammula cut costs of producing the film through various methods. By casting newcomers, he cut expenses to a reasonable level. As most of the shooting took place in the college, there was no need to construct sets. By partnering with Pantaloon Group, he saved another Rs 1 million in the costumes budget.

Release and reception
Happy Days was released on 28 September 2007 in the United States and 2 October 2007 in India. In addition, it was dubbed into Malayalam. The film received positive reviews for its fresh story, cast, screenplay, and songs.

A critic from Rediff.com wrote that "Don't miss Happy Days for you will be reminded of the days gone by. Savour that nostalgia as Sekhar gives you ample amount of it". Jeevi of Idlebrain.com wrote that "If he sticks to his sensibilities, Sekhar Kammula can never make a bad film. Go and watch Happy Days".

Box office
Though the film featured mostly newcomers, it became a commercial hit throughout India. It collected  10 crores (100million) in 50 days.

Awards
 Filmfare Awards South – 2008
 Best film – Sekhar Kammula
 Best Director – Sekhar Kammula
 Best Supporting Actress – Sonia Deepti
 Best Music Director – Mickey J. Meyer 
 Best Lyricist – Vanamali (Areyrey Areyrey)
 Best Male Playback Singer – Karthik (Areyrey Areyrey)

 Nandi Awards – 2008
 Second Best Feature Film - Silver – Sekhar Kammula
 Best Music Director – Mickey J Meyer 
 Best Male Playback Singer – Karthik (Oh My Friend)

 CineMAA Awards – 2008
 Best Film – Sekhar Kammula
 Best Director – Sekhar Kammula
 Best Story – Sekhar Kammula
 Best Screenplay – Sekhar Kammula
 Best Music – Ilayaraja 
 Best Lyricist – Vanamali (Areyrey Areyrey)
 Best Lyricist – Veturi
 Best Male Singer – Karthik (Areyrey Areyrey)

Soundtrack
The music was composed by Mickey J Meyer  and released by Big Music. The audio launch took place at Annapurna Studios on 24 August 2007, 100 students selected from various colleges in Hyderabad attended. The guests for the evening included BN Reddy (CBIT), Kamalakar Reddy (CBIT), Dil Raju, Sekhar Kammula, Ravi Naidu (BIG Music), Mahesh Kumar (Reliance business head), Ilayaraja , Swapna, C Vijaya Kumar, Ashok and the star cast.BN Reddy launched the audio CD and gave the first unit to Kamalakar Reddy.

Mickey J Meyer  won the Filmfare Award for Best Music Director – Telugu and Nandi Award for Best Music Director for this soundtrack.

Dubbed versions and remakes
The film was dubbed into Malayalam as Happy Days and re-made in Kannada as Jolly Days and released in 2008. Both versions proved to be successful. The Tamil remake, Inidhu Inidhu (2010), was directed by noted cinematographer K. V. Guhan under actor Prakash Raj's Duet Movies banner. The first schedule was completed in Vellore Institute of Technology, Vellore (also called VIT University) and featured newcomers as protagonists. Mickey J. Meyer was retained as the music director and the project was his first venture in Tamil.

In 2014, there were speculations that a Hindi remake of Happy Days would be directed by Sekhar himself, and would be co-produced by Salman Khan. However, there were no further updates.

References
Arey Arey Mp3 Song By Mp3Reels

External links
 

2007 films
Telugu films remade in other languages
Films scored by Mickey J Meyer
2000s buddy comedy films
2000s coming-of-age comedy-drama films
Indian buddy comedy-drama films
Indian coming-of-age comedy-drama films
Films about teacher–student relationships
Films set in universities and colleges
Films directed by Sekhar Kammula
2000s Telugu-language films